Annick Loiseau (born 1957) is a French physicist who is a researcher at the French National Centre for Scientific Research Laboratory of Microstructure Studies and Mechanics of Materials. She was the first woman to be appointed to the Office National d'Etudes et de Recherches Aérospatiales (ONERA). Her research considers low-dimensional materials such as carbon nanotubes, graphene, and boron nitride. In 2006 she was awarded the CNRS Silver Medal.

Early life and education 
Loiseau studied at Chimie ParisTech. During the end of her studies she completed an internship at the ONERA solid-state physics laboratory. She moved to the Paris-Sud University for her doctoral studies.

Research and career 
Loiseau joined the faculty at the French aerospace laboratory, Office National d'Etudes et de Recherches Aérospatiales (ONERA). At ONERA, she worked on high-resolution electron microscopy, which she developed to study metal alloys. In 1992 she became interested in carbon nanotubes, which had recently been discovered by Sumio Iijima. She started to work on graphene and carbon-nanotubes, and eventually led the Graphene-Nanotube Research Group.

In 1996 Loiseau became the first woman to be appointed research director at ONERA. She has focused on transmission electron microscopy electron energy loss spectroscopy (TEM–EELS).  Her current research activities focus on synthesis and study of the structural, optical and electronic properties of nanomaterials by optical spectroscopy and TEM-EELS 

Loiseau has been involved in the Graphene Flagship since its start in 2013 and is a current member of its executive board.

Awards and honours 

 1988 Grand Prix Aluminum Pechiney of the Academy of Sciences
 1995 Chimie ParisTech metallurgy medal
 1999  of the Société Française de Physique 
 2006 CNRS Silver Medal
 2011 Legion of Honour

Selected publications

Journal articles

Books

References 

1957 births
French physicists
Recipients of the Legion of Honour
Living people
Chimie ParisTech alumni